Gentlemen of the Press is a 1929 all-talking American pre-Code film starring Walter Huston in his first feature film role, and Kay Francis and an uncredited Brian Donlevy in their film debuts. The film still survives. This film's copyright has expired, and it is now in the public domain. It survives in a copy sold to MCA for television distribution.

The film is based on Ward Morehouse's 1928 Broadway play Gentlemen of the Press.

In the 1930 silent melodrama by Yasujirō Ozu, That Night's Wife (Sono yo no tsuma), a poster of this film is prominently displayed (Ozu, who had a "passionate love of American film", according to scholar David Bordwell, often featured in his films posters of movies he liked).

Cast
 Walter Huston - Wickland Snell
 Charles Ruggles - Charlie Haven
 Kay Francis - Myra May
 Betty Lawford - Dorothy Snell Hanley
 Norman Foster - Ted Hanley
 Duncan Penwarden - Mr. Higgenbottom

uncredited
 Brian Donlevy - Kelly (a reporter)

References

External links
Gentlemen of the Press at IMDb.com

lobby poster

1929 films
1929 drama films
1920s English-language films
Films about journalists
American films based on plays
Films directed by Millard Webb
Films shot in New York City
Paramount Pictures films
American black-and-white films
American drama films
1920s American films